Buttressed core is a structural system for high buildings, consisting of a hexagonal core reinforced by three buttresses that form a Y shape.

Properties
The buttressed core supports itself both laterally and torsionally. It also eliminates the need for column transfers, and moves loads in a smooth path from the building's top into its foundations.

Origin
The buttressed core was invented by the Skidmore, Owings & Merrill engineer
Bill Baker.  
It was first used in Tower Palace III in Seoul but its ability to support higher buildings than ever before was first demonstrated in Burj Khalifa in Dubai.

Uses
 Tower Palace III in Seoul, South Korea, completed in 2004
 Burj Khalifa in Dubai, United Arab Emirates, completed in 2009
 Crown Las Vegas in Las Vegas, USA (never built)
 Jeddah Tower in Jeddah, Saudi Arabia, currently on hold in 2021

References

Structural system